The FIFA Youth Tournament Under-18 1949 Final Tournament was held in the Netherlands.

Teams
The following teams entered the tournament:

 
 
 
 
  (host)

First round
For this round  received a Bye.

Supplementary round
In this round the losing teams from the first round participated.

 received a Bye.

Semi-finals

Fifth-place match

Third place match

Final

External links
Results by RSSSF

1949
1949
1948–49 in European football
1948–49 in English football
1948–49 in French football
1948–49 in Dutch football
1948–49 in Austrian football
1948–49 in Belgian football
1948–49 in Northern Ireland association football
1948–49 in Scottish football
April 1949 sports events in Europe
1949 in youth association football